Football was contested for men only at the 1985 Summer Universiade in Kobe, Japan.

References
 Universiade football medalists on HickokSports
 Detailed results

U
1985 Summer Universiade
Football at the Summer Universiade
International association football competitions hosted by Japan
1985 in Japanese football